Robert Paul Mahoney (June 20, 1928 – August 27, 2000) was an American Major League Baseball pitcher who played for the Chicago White Sox and St. Louis Browns in  and .

External links

1928 births
2000 deaths
Chicago White Sox players
St. Louis Browns players
Major League Baseball pitchers
Baseball players from Minnesota
Carthage Cardinals players
Pocatello Cardinals players
Omaha Cardinals players
San Antonio Missions players
People from Mower County, Minnesota